Aviatsionnaya Ispitatelnaya Stantsiya (AIS) was a naval air test station in Russia during World War I notable for designing and producing several aircraft designs.  The facility was founded at the Petrograd Polytechnic Institute near the end of 1916 with a seaplane base on Krestovsky Island.

Aircraft 

Two aircraft designs were created by AIS.  The first, produced by engineer P. A. Shishkov, was a Farman pusher-biplane type modified to carry a torpedo, powered by a 130 hp Clerget engine.  First flight was achieved in August 1917, and several flights of more than 1 hour were completed.  A second design, named Aist, was built in the fall of 1917, as a two-seat seaplane powered by a 150 hp Sunbeam engine.  The Aist was armed with two machine guns, one fixed and one on a flexible mount.

See also 

 List of aircraft (A)

References 

 

Defunct aircraft manufacturers of Russia